Cleber Alexandre Gomes (born May 7, 1976), known as just Cleber, is a former Brazilian football player.

Club statistics

References

External links

1976 births
Living people
Brazilian footballers
Brazilian expatriate footballers
J2 League players
Mito HollyHock players
Expatriate footballers in Japan
Association football forwards